George J. Hatfield State Recreation Area is a state park unit on the Merced River Merced County, California.

Features
The park has many native riparian zone trees and is home to various wildlife, especially birds. Swimming, fishing and picnicking are popular activities.

The  park was established in 1953.

See also
List of California state parks

References

External links 
 George J. Hatfield State Recreation Area

California State Recreation Areas
Parks in Merced County, California
Merced River
Protected areas established in 1953
1953 establishments in California